The Lapau, also known as the Royal Ceremonial Hall, is a ceremonial hall in Bandar Seri Begawan, Brunei. It is where the royal ceremonies, state investiture and some state events are traditionally held. It was the place where the present Sultan of Brunei, Sultan Hassanal Bolkiah, was crowned in 1968.

Name 
 is historically the type of a Bruneian traditional hall where royal ceremonies and audiences were held. It is believed to have existed since the first Sultan of Brunei, Sultan Muhammad Shah, and since then various  buildings had been built over the course of time.

Location 
The building is located in Pusat Bandar, the city centre of Bandar Seri Begawan. Some notable landmarks in its vicinity include the Royal Regalia Museum, the Youth Centre and the Main Post Office building.

History 
It was built during the reign of Sultan Omar Ali Saifuddien III and still exists today, whereby it is now commonly known as the Old Lapau to distinguish from the current Lapau. It is now part of the Brunei History Centre building. Since 2018 it has been repurposed into a historical gallery pertaining to the Constitution of Brunei.

The plan to build a new  building was first proposed in 1963. The plan as well as the design of the new building was first proposed by Sultan Omar Ali Saifuddien III himself, and later refined by the commissioned architect firm Booty Edwards & Partners. It was built at a site which was then in Kampong Kianggeh. The construction began in August 1965 and completed in 1968.

It was also the place where the agreement was signed between Brunei and the Great Britain on 23 November 1971, which gave Brunei full internal independence except defence and foreign affairs.

Ceremonies 
The Lapau is the traditional place for the 'opening' ceremonies of the Gendang Jaga-Jaga, a Bruneian traditional ceremony to mark the start of a royal event or festivity such as coronations and royal weddings. The  itself is a Bruneian traditional musical ensemble which is only played every day during seasons of royal ceremonies and festivities.

This is a traditional ceremony, carried out to mark the end of the mourning period upon the demise of the Sultan or a royal family member.

Royal ceremonies have been traditionally held in the Lapau. However, nowadays and due to capacity constraint they are held in Istana Nurul Iman.

References

External links 
 
 Lapau in the State Adat Istiadat Department website 

Buildings and structures in Bandar Seri Begawan